The 2012 PartyPoker.com Premier League was a professional non-ranking snooker tournament that was played from 16 August to 25 November 2012. This was the last edition of the tournament, as in 2013 it was replaced by the Champion of Champions.

Ronnie O'Sullivan was the defending champion, but he decided not to compete this year.

Stuart Bingham won his eighth professional title by defeating Judd Trump 7–2 in the final.

Prize fund
The breakdown of prize money for this year is shown below:
 Winner: £50,000
 Runner-up: £25,000
 Semi-final: £12,500
 Frame-win: £1,000 (only in league phase)
 Century break: £1,000 (only in league phase)
 Highest break: £5,000
 Maximum break: £25,000
 Total: £210,000

Players

League phase

Dates and venues

Group one 

The top two qualified for the play-offs. If points were level then most frames won determined their positions. If two players had an identical record then the result in their match determined their positions. If their match was a 3–3 draw then the player who got to three first was higher. (Breaks above 50 shown between (parentheses); century breaks are indicated with bold.)
 Ding Junhui 4–2 Shaun Murphy → 22–(81), 55–54, (82)–0, 9–76 (63), 79–11, (64) 72–14
 Mark Selby 1–5 Neil Robertson → 11–72 (63), 12–64, 16–(72), (61) 87–37, 17–72 (62), 9–71
 Shaun Murphy 3–3 Stuart Bingham → 16–83 (53), (54) 55–(68), 0–105 (59), (88)–51, (58) 97–0, 77–53
 Neil Robertson 4–2 Shaun Murphy → 44–60, 73–58 (53), 0–(111), (70) 82–0, (113) 118–1, (58) 68–29
 Stuart Bingham 4–2 Ding Junhui → (75)–24, 79–8, 0–102 (54), 16–(73), (75)–20, (50) 80–37
 Mark Selby 2–4 Ding Junhui → 27–(96), 27–63, 25–72, 4–94 (79), 73–39, (52) 90–39
 Stuart Bingham 6–0 Mark Selby → (52) 65–56, (59) 67–0, (54) 69–0, (128)–1, (122)–1, (50) 57–13
 Stuart Bingham 6–0 Neil Robertson → (135) 139–0, 77–33, 75–66 (66), (127)–0, 61–20, (92)–0
 Mark Selby 1–5 Shaun Murphy → 6–(86), 81–1, 0–97, 22–72 (55), 0–(116), 0–(81)
 Neil Robertson 4–2 Ding Junhui → (71)–72 (53), 5–102 (95), 62–(59), (70) 83–26, 77–22, (51) 67–(57)

Group two 

The top two qualified for the play-offs. If points were level then most frames won determined their positions. If two players had an identical record then the result in their match determined their positions. If their match was a 3–3 draw then the player who got to three first was higher. (Breaks above 50 shown between (parentheses); century breaks are indicated with bold.)
 Judd Trump 5–1 Stephen Lee → 57–47, (95) 96–0, 63–61, (121)–0, (113)–0, 0–(68)
 Stephen Lee 1–5 Peter Ebdon → 16–73, 56–60, (87) 90–2, 1–(80), 45–(83), 21–(103)
 John Higgins 4–2 Mark Allen → 0–71 (67), 69–34, 67–63, 58–70, (59) 95–39, (52) 76–30
 Mark Allen 4–2 Peter Ebdon → 34–72, (84) 92–1, (76) 81–30, (50) 75–1, 19–(108), (69)–17
 Judd Trump 4–2 Peter Ebdon → 53–60, 62–55, 7–71, (131)–0, (90)–1, 79–4
 John Higgins 4–2 Stephen Lee → 13–67, 59–38, 1–76, (72)–0, (57) 80–1, 66–62
 Mark Allen v Stephen Lee
 Judd Trump 2–4 John Higgins → 79–0, 4–119 (114), 43–70 (52), 24–80, 39–84 (63), (78) 83–27
 Judd Trump 5–1 Mark Allen → 102–0, 40–74 (60), (76)–0, 81–0, (76)–54, 77–48
 John Higgins 2–4 Peter Ebdon → 29–66, (125) 130–1, (133)–0, 1–87 (75), 11–68 (61), 47–(81)

Play-offs 
24–25 November, Grimsby Auditorium, Grimsby, England

* 71–13, 74–44, 22–94 (58), 0–81 (81), (117) 132–0, 52–65, (50)–(76), (74) 74–8, (57) 71–34
** 65–77 (55), 14–68, 54–15, 0–87, 60–58, 81–0, 56–29, 45–78 (58), 71–16
***7–(83), (82)–0, (100)–8, 76–33, (55, 53) 116–9, (61) 74–5, 0–(101), (71) 115–9, 58–54

Qualifiers

The qualification for this tournament, the Championship League was played in eight groups from 9 January to 22 March 2012.

Century breaks

 135, 128, 127, 122, 117, 100  Stuart Bingham
 133, 124, 114  John Higgins
 131, 121, 113, 101  Judd Trump
 116, 111  Shaun Murphy
 113  Neil Robertson
 108, 103  Peter Ebdon

Notes

References

External links
 

2012
Premier League
Premier League Snooker